Michael James Baab (born December 6, 1959) is a former American football center who played eleven seasons in the National Football League, mainly with the Cleveland Browns.

Early years
Raised in Euless, Texas, he graduated from Trinity High School in 1978. Consensus All-State and All-American honors came his senior year of 1978. While attending the University of Texas at Austin from 1978–1981, Mike was voted team captain by his Longhorn teammates. He received All-Southwest Conference and second-team All-American honors in 1981. He was named to the Pepsi All-Time High School Team and he was inducted into the Texas Hall of Honor in 2008 http://www.texassports.com/news/2008/10/29/102908aaa_759.aspx

NFL
Baab was selected by the Cleveland Browns in the 5th round of the 1982 NFL Draft, the 115th overall pick. He played for the Browns from 1982 to 1987, the New England Patriots in 1988 and 1989, the Browns again in 1990 and 1991, and finished his career with the Kansas City Chiefs in 1992.

Personal life 
After retiring from football, Baab moved to the Scottish Highland Games for competition.  He won the Masters World Championship in the 45-49 age class in 2005.
Mike lives in Austin, Texas with his wife Lolis, his college sweetheart, and his two daughters, Micaela and Larissa. Both girls compete in Highland Athletics.

References 

1959 births
Living people
Sportspeople from Fort Worth, Texas
Players of American football from Austin, Texas
American football centers
Texas Longhorns football players
Cleveland Browns players
New England Patriots players
Kansas City Chiefs players
People from Euless, Texas